Hebia petiolata is a species of tachinid flies in the genus Hebia of the family Tachinidae.

External links

Exoristinae